Jimi Dams (born June 1963) is a Belgian-American contemporary artist.

Early life 

Dams started drawing from a young age. He studied at the Academy of Fine Arts in Antwerp, Belgium but eventually moved on to Brussels to continue his studies. He worked primarily with Belgian minimalist Luc Claus and graduated summa cum laude in 1984.

Career

1986–1990 

Dams’ first solo exhibition PunkMe (1986), Jordaenshuis, Antwerp, featured linocut portraits evocative of his life in the underground Punk scene. 

Inspired by British post-punk ballet dancer Michael Clark, Dams started exploring movement as a subject matter for his work. A series of drawings and linocuts, featuring Clark, was exhibited in MOve (1987) an exhibition at Harrods, London. He went on to explore movement in series with dancers.

In 1988, Dams’ artwork moved towards drawings, murals and installations. During that time, he also began to develop a strong interest in collaborating with other artists. His work with writer Tom Lanoye, Cocktale (1988), was the first in a series of collaborations with artists from different disciplines such as writer Peter Verhelst, artist Amanda Lear, novelist and poet Dennis Cooper, curator Joshua Compston and artist Devon Dikeou (Zingmagazine). 

The first book on the artist’s work, 78 Linos (1990), was published by De Carbolineum Pers, Belgium.

1990–2004 

In 1991, Dams was the subject of a RTBF (French Belgian public service Radio and Television) documentary. He continued to exhibit throughout Europe. 
After his LR.Lear (1993) exhibition at Galérie Oz, Paris, galleries such as Gracie Mansion, New York, Torch, Amsterdam and Galerie S&H De Buck, Ghent started representing his work. In 1997, Dams’ ANP exhibition at S&H De Buck gallery, Ghent, was featured on BRTN (Dutch Belgian public service Radio and Television). An interview for Studio Brussel (Dutch Belgian radio) aired the same year.

From 1991 on, Dams’ work has been exhibited in museums in Belgium, The Netherlands, Germany, Austria, the U.S. and China as well as in art galleries worldwide.

Envoy enterprises

2005–present 

In 2005, Dams opened envoy enterprises, an independent contemporary art space, in Manhattan. Currently located in New York’s Lower East Side, in 2007, envoy enterprises was the first to leave the Chelsea Art district for the Lower East side. 

In June 2017, ARTnews and Artforum reported the closing of envoy enterprises’ exhibition space. Dams addressed his disgust with the way the art world was evolving and announced that his exhibition program would, at some point, return albeit in a different format.

envoy enterprises continues to represent artists from its 87 Rivington Street address.

References 

 Artforum article 22 June, 2017
 ARTnews article 20 June, 2017
 The Conversation Pod interview with Jimi Dams, 26 August, 2017
 Art in America article
 Vernissage TV interview with Jimi Dams, New York, 5 March, 2012 
 Time Out New York article 24 July, 2010
 Vernissage TV interview with Jimi Dams, Paris, 29 October, 2006
Eyemazing Eyemazing Magazine issue #2, 2 March, 2004; article and interview with Jimi Dams; pages 22-37
 Phantom der Lust Weibel,Peter. Exhibition catalogue, Neue Galerie Graz, Austria, 2003, Belleville publishers, pp.512  
 Fiers, Els, ‘Jimi Dams, Killing Time’, Knack (magazine), 15 January, 2003; p.85 
 Zing Magazine  Persistence of Memory, interview with Jimi Dams and Amanda Lear, Zingmagazine, Issue 16, spring 2002
 kunst aspekte, Blondies and Brownies exhibition at Aktionsforum Praterinsel, Munich Germany, 2001
 Kaufman, Hayley, “Glam Not Gone”, The Boston Globe, 2 November, 2001; p.C2
 Cotter, Holland, “Not a. Lear”, The New York Times, 12 October, 2001; p.E37
 McCormick, Carlo, “Jimi Dams Masters the Art of Anguish”, Paper (magazine), May, 2001, p.38 
 Doove, Edith, “Verrassingen uit Amerika”, De Standaard, 3 February, 1999 p.2
 Lindgaard, Jade, “Angelus Novus”, Les inrockuptibles, 11 March, 1997
 , Zodiac of the Satin Altar, poems by Peter Verhelst and drawings by Jimi Dams, published by De Carbolineum Pers, Antwerp, p.80
 Jacobs, Peter, “Jimi Dams”(Kultuur, Interview Jimi Dams), Het Nieuwsblad, 19 December, 1991, p.30
 Hanestaart, poems by Tom Lanoye and art by Jimi Dams, published by Bert Bakker, Amsterdam,1990, pp.68  
  Hanestaart, poems by Tom Lanoye, art by Jimi Dams, published by Sub Signo Libelli, The Netherlands, 1988

External links 

 envoy enterprises Website

Living people
1963 births
Belgian artists
Artists from New York (state)